is a  motor racing circuit in Taka District, Hyōgo, Japan. It is now used only for occasional karting races, and mainly for private rental. A non championship Super GT race was held here in 1996.

References

External links 
  

Motorsport venues in Japan
Sports venues in Hyōgo Prefecture